Archie Basilio dela Cruz (born August 15, 1996), known professionally as Flow G, is a Filipino rapper, singer-songwriter, and member of the Filipino hip-hop collective Ex Battalion.

Career
On January 17, 2020, Gloc-9 released a collaborative track entitled "Halik" featuring Flow G. In March 2020, they performed the song on Wish 107.5, and the performance dominated and reached the No. 1 spot on YouTube's trending chart in the Philippines a few hours after the upload. On April 15, 2020, the video became a trend for a third week in a row, alongside Gloc-9's 24 bars challenge video.

On February 3, 2020, Flow G released his single "Araw-Araw Love" (lit. Every Day Love) and the track's music video, with a special appearance in the video to feature his YouTuber girlfriend Angelica Jane Yap, also known as Pastillas Girl on the show It's Showtime. It dominated the list and took YouTube Philippine's #3 spot a day after the upload.

In December 2020, Flow G's single "Araw-Araw Love" became one of the 'most viewed' music videos on YouTube PH, which has almost 73 million views to date, topping the South Korean group BLACKPINK who came in second. As of now, it is still one of the most streamed tracks so far.

On February 4, 2021, Flow G joined Gloc-9's talent management Asintada.

On April 19, 2021, Flow G along with JRoa released their single "Hangga't Maaari" in which the track portrays the changes in a relationship. The track then dominated YouTube PH's trending chart sitting in the No. 3 spot gaining over two million views in a day.

On April 26, 2021, Flow G released a collaborative track entitled "Ibong Adarna" featuring Gloc-9. The video then garnered millions of views in a day. This is his first single under Gloc-9's talent management Asintada, along with his first track featuring Gloc-9. He published the song on digital platforms (including Apple Music) days later under Viva Records Corporation, making it his return to the label.

Controversies
On April 18, 2020, Flow G had beef with FlipTop Isabuhay Champion Sixth Threat. He released his diss track entitled "Unli", a response to "Pilipinong Wack" by 3 Digitz, a Sixth Threat group. A few weeks later, he released his second diss track entitled "Pasaload", a response to "Expired" by Sixth Threat, pointing out Flow G in the song.
Netizens were suspicious of Gloc-9 for 'alluding' Sixth Threat on his social media accounts. Sixth Threat also called out Gloc-9 for being Flow G's 'ghost writer' in the making of "Pasaload".

In September 2020, Flow G released a promotional track "Deym" to endorse their clothing line "Brand for 199x", involving Skusta Clee as an ambassador of the brand. They were allegedly accused of plagiarizing the song "Ddaeng" by BTS, which was released on SoundCloud in 2018. Surprisingly, the group's management debunked allegations and made a clarification that the two songs are 'inherently different'. The manager also claimed that the artists used a generic flow and added that “parallel thinking among artists do happen and it cannot be avoided".

On August 15, 2021, Flow G released his single entitled 'G Wolf' with an accompanying music video directed by Titus Cee. The music video has amassed over 5 million views in the first two weeks on YouTube and has over 22 million views to date. The controversial piece is a response to last year's feud with Sixth Threat and a direct slam to his detractors. Months later, OneMusicPH described it as it's "almost like Larry Bird telling his defender where he'll shoot the ball on the deciding play and still makes the shot."

Discography

Singles

As a lead artist

As a featured artist

Awards and nominations

See also
 Filipino hip hop

References

External links 
 
 

1996 births
Living people
Filipino rappers
Tagalog people
Universal Records (Philippines) artists
21st-century Filipino male singers
Ex Battalion members